Edmund Dinis (October 4, 1924 – March 14, 2010) was an American politician from Massachusetts.

He was born in the Azores, after his parents were already U.S. citizens. Massachusetts]]. His father Jacinto F. Diniz served in the Massachusetts House of Representatives. After graduating from high school, Dinis served in the United States Army during World War II. He then studied law at Suffolk University and was admitted to the Massachusetts bar. Dinis also went to the University of Chicago and to the Harvard University Graduate School of Public Administration.

Dinis was a member of the Massachusetts House of Representatives from 1949 to 1951, the New Bedford City Council from 1952 to 1953, and the Massachusetts State Senate from 1953 to 1957. From 1973 to 1979 he was the treasurer of Bristol County, Massachusetts. Dinis also served as district attorney for Bristol County from 1973 to 1975. He prosecuted the Chappaquiddick incident involving Senator Ted Kennedy. He was defeated for reelection in 1974 by John A. Tierney. He was an unsuccessful candidate for the United States House of Representatives seat in Massachusetts's 12th congressional district in 1976, district attorney in 1978 and 1982, the Massachusetts Governor's Council in 1980, and Bristol County Sheriff in 1984.

Dinis owned radio station WJFD-FM from 1975 until his death on March 14, 2010, in Dartmouth, Massachusetts.

See also
 Massachusetts legislature: 1949–1950, 1953–1954, 1955–1956

References

External links

1924 births
2010 deaths
Portuguese emigrants to the United States
Politicians from New Bedford, Massachusetts
People from São Miguel Island
Suffolk University alumni
Harvard Kennedy School alumni
University of Chicago alumni
Businesspeople from Massachusetts
Massachusetts lawyers
County district attorneys in Massachusetts
County treasurers in Massachusetts
Massachusetts city council members
Democratic Party Massachusetts state senators
Democratic Party members of the Massachusetts House of Representatives
Military personnel from Massachusetts
20th-century American lawyers
Ted Kennedy
American people of Portuguese descent